The Okeluse Forest Reserve is situated in Okeluse, an agrarian community in Ose Local Government Area of Ondo State, South West Nigeria, West Africa.

References

Forest Reserves of Nigeria